= Jade Beatriz =

Brazilian student activist (born 2001)

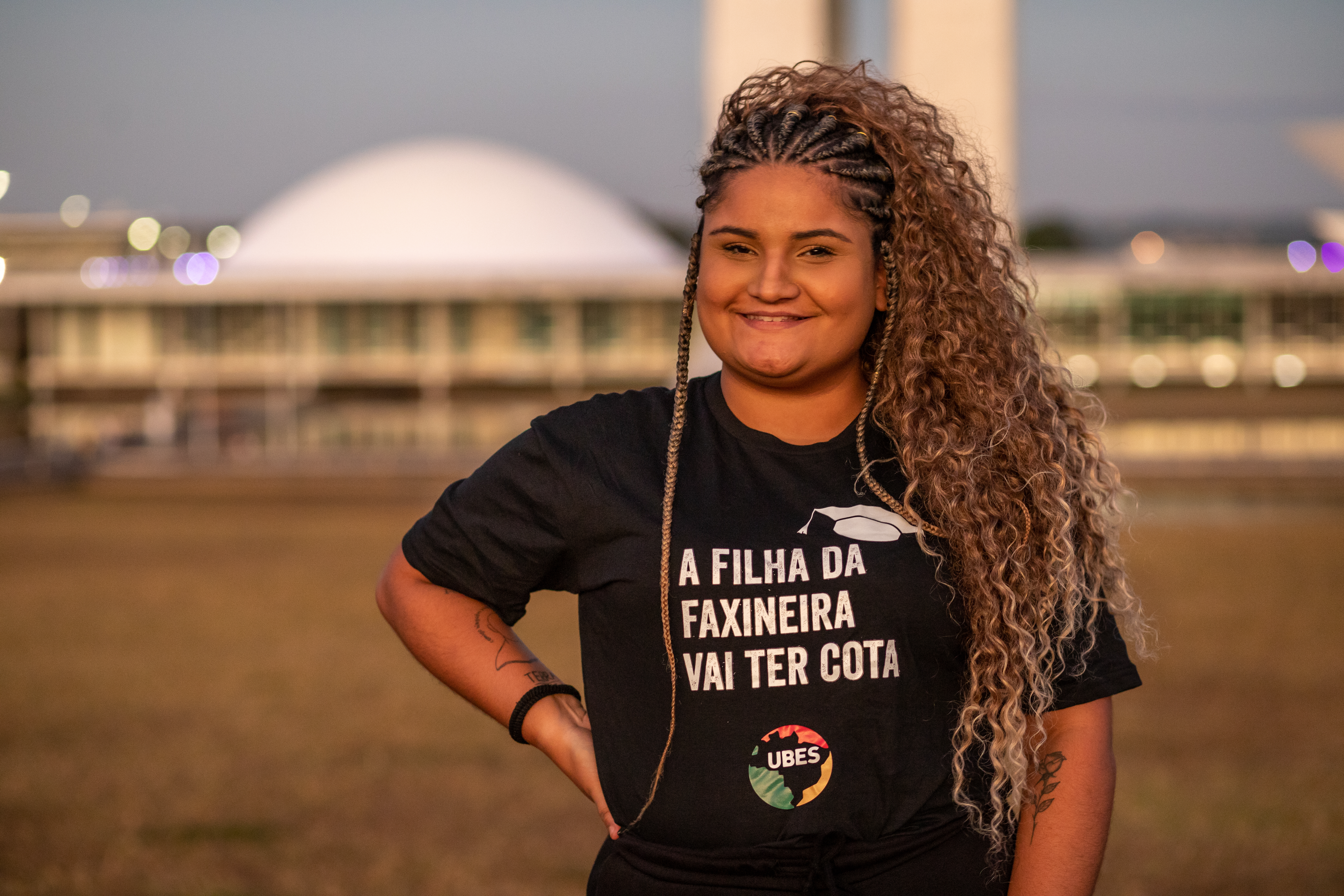

President of the Brazilian Union of High School Students
- In office May 15, 2022 – June 16, 2024
- Preceded by: Rozana Barroso
- Succeeded by: Hugo Silva

Personal details
- Born: August 24, 2001 (age 24) Fortaleza, Brazil
- Party: Communist Party of Brazil
- Profession: Activist

Ana Beatriz Martins Melo Rodrigues (born August 24, 2001), also known as Jade Beatriz, is a student, activist, poet and slammer in the Brazilian student movement. She is currently the president of the Brazilian Union of High School Students (UBES), having been elected during the movements 44th Congress. Jade is the first woman from Ceará to lead the UBES.

As a person of color from suburban Northeast Brazil, she claims to be the first in her family to pursue higher education. In addition to writing articles on education in the national press, she is a columnist for Notícia Preta. Jade is a member of The Socialist Youth Union, the youth wing of the Communist Party of Brazil.

== Biography ==
Born and raised in the district of Ellery, on the outskirts of Fortaleza, she is the eldest of five children of a couple who were cleaners and fruit sellers. Jade graduated from state technical high school with a concentration in logistics, and is a currently a university student.

She began her career in the student movement as founder and president of the Frida Khalo guild, at the Dona Creusa do Carmo Rocha State School of Professional Training. Before assuming the presidency of the UBES, she has served as director of the department of culture at the Cearense Association of Secondary Students (ACES) from 2019. In 2020, she was the youngest candidate for councilor in Fortaleza.

Jade was elected to lead the UBES for the next two years with 84.79% of the votes. She was part of the "United in the effort to defend education and Brazil" campaign, at the 44th Conubes, held in Brasília, which was attended by 2,000 students, considered the largest in the history of the entity in its 73 years of existence.
